Marco Andrés Millape Arismendi (born April 30, 1976) is a Chilean football manager and former footballer.

Managerial career
From 2013 to 2017, he worked as the manager of Provincial Osorno, returning in 2020 until March 2021. Also, he had a brief term as the manager of Deportes Iquique at under-19 level.

Personal life
His nickname, Torito (Little Bull), was given by the Chilean play-by-play commentator Claudio Palma, due to the fact that he comes from Osorno, a city which is an important agricultural center well-suited to the breeding of Chilean cattle. Since the nickname was given, Millape began to celebrate his goals making an imitation of a bull.

Honours

Club
Colo-Colo
 Primera División de Chile (1): 2002 Clausura

Deportes Iquique
 Copa Chile (1): 2010
 Primera B (1): 2010

References

External links
 
 

1976 births
Living people
People from Osorno, Chile
Chilean people of Mapuche descent
Mapuche sportspeople
Indigenous sportspeople of the Americas
Chilean footballers
Chilean Primera División players
Primera B de Chile players
Provincial Osorno footballers
Deportes Temuco footballers
Colo-Colo footballers
Cobreloa footballers
O'Higgins F.C. footballers
Ñublense footballers
Universidad de Concepción footballers
Rangers de Talca footballers
Deportes Iquique footballers
Association football midfielders
Chilean football managers
Provincial Osorno managers